The Men's junior road race of the 2011 UCI Road World Championships was a cycling event that took place on 24 September 2011 in Copenhagen, Denmark.

Final classification

References 

Men's junior road race
UCI Road World Championships – Men's junior road race